Jitter is the deviation in frequency of a signal.

Jitter may also refer to:
 Jitter (optics), the oscillatory motion of the image with respect to the detector, which blurs the recorded image
 Delay jitter, in packet switched networks
 Fixation (visual) or retinal jitter, the maintaining of the visual gaze on a single location
 Jittered, a method of supersampling
 Jitters (band), a Belarusian band from the 1990s and the 2000s 
 The Jitters, a Canadian band from the 1980s
 Jitter, a package included in the Max visual programming language